BeritaSatu World is an Indonesian television station which broadcasts news program since 2014. This channel is also useful as a dedicated channel for the international news. This channel is the upper-middle class. The owner and founder is Peter F. Gontha.

History 
BeritaSatu World was officially started in 2014 as a news and entertainment television channel, together with BeritaSatu Sports, and BeritaSatu English. In the beginning, the channel did not broadcast 24 hours per day. later, BeritaSatu World aired for 24 hours. BeritaSatu World became a new member of BeritaSatu Media Holdings is owned by Lippo Group. Due to the COVID-19 pandemic, this channel only aired programmes produced before the COVID-19 pandemic in Indonesia.

References

Television channels and stations established in 2014